Hari Nur Yulianto (born 31 July 1989) is an Indonesian professional footballer who plays as a forward for Liga 1 club PSIS Semarang.

Club career

PSCS Cilacap
Hari Nur started his career in 2010–11 Liga Indonesia Premier Division. He made 2 goals in 9 games.

Persibangga Purbalingga
He was signed for Persibangga Purbalingga to play in the Indonesian Premier Division in the 2011-12 season.

PSIS Semarang
He started his season debut with PSIS in 2013 by scoring 6 goals but only managed to bring PSIS Semarang to the quarter final. In the following season (2014), his name became increasingly famous when he had a duet with Julio Alcorsé. He became the fourth top scorer of the 2014 Liga Indonesia Premier Division, in this 2014 season he also managed to score 2 hat-tricks, each against PSGC Ciamis on 12 October 2014 and Persiwa Wamena on 22 October 2014, both in the top 8 of the 2014 Indonesian Premier Division. In his second season with PSIS Semarang Hari reunited with the Central Java Contingent in the football team for PON XVIII including Fauzan Fajri, Saptono, Vidi Hasiholan, Eli Nasokha, and Ivo Andre Wibowo who had won bronze together at the XVIII PON event.

Honours

Club
PSIS Semarang
 Liga 2 third place (play-offs): 2017

References

External links
 Hari Nur Yulianto at Soccerway

1989 births
Living people
Indonesian footballers
People from Kendal Regency
Sportspeople from Central Java
Association football forwards
Liga 2 (Indonesia) players
Liga 1 (Indonesia) players
PSIS Semarang players
PSCS Cilacap players